The Royal Family Order of Saints George and Constantine was an order of the Greek royal family. For the duration of its existence, it has been the second highest decoration awarded by the modern Greek state and the Greek crown, after the Order of the Redeemer. It was instituted in January 1936 by King George II in the memory of his grandfather (King George I) and his father (King Constantine I). The order is awarded only to men, while the corresponding Order of Saints Olga and Sophia is reserved for women. The order's design was influenced by the royal family's Danish origin, evoking the appearance of the Order of the Dannebrog. The order is not awarded since 1975 by the Greek state after the abolition of monarchy and today is awarded only by the Greek Royal Family.

Grades 

The Order has six classes:

Collar ('Περιδέραιον') - wears the badge of the Order on a chain  round the neck and the distinctive star of the Order on the left chest; 
Grand Cross ('Μεγαλόσταυρος') - wears the badge of the Order on a collar or on a sash on the right shoulder, and the star of the Order on the left chest; 
Grand Commander ('Ανώτερος Ταξιάρχης') - wears the badge and the star of the Order on the right chest; 
Commander ('Ταξιάρχης') - wears the badge of the Order on a necklet; 
Gold Cross ('Χρυσούς Σταυρός') - wears the badge on a ribbon on the left chest; 
Silver Cross ('Αργυρούς Σταυρός') - wears the badge on a ribbon on the left chest.

External links 

 The Greek Royal Orders
 George J. Beldecos, "Hellenic Orders, Decorations and Medals", pub. Hellenic War Museum, Athens 1991, .

 
Saints George and Constantine
1936 establishments in Greece
Awards established in 1936
Saints George and Constantine